United Nations Security Council resolution 861, adopted unanimously on 27 August 1993, after recalling Resolution 841 (1993) and welcoming an agreement between the President of Haiti and the commander-in-chief of the Armed Forces of Haiti, the council, acting under Chapter VII of the United Nations Charter, suspended international sanctions against Haiti.

At the same time, the sanctions would be reimposed if at any point the council is informed by the secretary-general that the parties to the agreement or any other authorities in Haiti had not complied in good faith with the agreement. All measures would be reviewed with a view to lifting them definitively when the secretary-general, having regard for the views of the Secretary General of the Organization of American States, informed the security council that all parties have fully implemented the agreement.

The agreement would not be fully implemented which led the Security Council to reimpose sanctions in Resolution 875.

See also
 History of Haiti
 List of United Nations Security Council Resolutions 801 to 900 (1993–1994)

References

External links
 
Text of the Resolution at undocs.org

 0861
1993 in Haiti
 0861
United Nations Security Council sanctions regimes
August 1993 events